Jo(h)annes Dubravius (c. 1486 in Plzeň – 9 September 1553 in Kroměříž) was a Czech churchman, humanist and writer. He became the bishop of Olomouc. His name is given also as Jan Dubravius or Janus Dubravius, Jan Skála z Doubravky and Jan z Doubravky, and Dubravinius.

Works
Martiani Capellae Nuptiae Mercurii cum Philologia, commentary on Martianus Capella
Theriobulia Joannis Dubravii iurisconsulti et equitis aurati De regiis praeceptis, poetic beast fables 
Commentarii in V Davidis psalmum 
Libellus de piscinis et piscium, qui in eis aluntur natura, a work on fish ponds, dedicated to Anton Fugger, cited by Izaak Walton 
Historia regni Bohemiae (1552), chronicle

External links
 De piscinis et piscium, qui in eis aluntur naturis, in five books, (1559)
 Historia Bohemica (1687)

1486 births
1553 deaths
Czech Renaissance humanists
Czech poets
Czech male poets
Bishops of Olomouc
16th-century Bohemian Roman Catholic theologians